Prefectural elections were held in Tokyo for the city's Metropolitan Assembly on 3 July 2005. The election was a great success for the Democratic Party of Japan which won 16 additional seats, closing in on the Liberal Democratic Party.

Results

|-
! style="background-color:#E9E9E9;text-align:left;" |Parties
! style="background-color:#E9E9E9;text-align:right;" |Candidates
! style="background-color:#E9E9E9;text-align:right;" |Votes
! style="background-color:#E9E9E9;text-align:right;" |%
! style="background-color:#E9E9E9;text-align:right;" |Seats
|-
| style="text-align:left;" |Liberal Democratic Party of Japan (自由民主党, Jiyū Minshutō)
| style="text-align:right;" | 57
| style="text-align:right;" | 1,339,548
| style="text-align:right;" | 30.7
| style="text-align:right;" | 48
|-
| style="text-align:left;" |Democratic Party of Japan (民主党, Minshutō)
| style="text-align:right;" | 51
| style="text-align:right;" | 1,070,893
| style="text-align:right;" | 24.5
| style="text-align:right;" | 35
|-
| style="text-align:left;" |New Komeito party (公明党, Kōmeitō)
| style="text-align:right;" | 23
| style="text-align:right;" | 786,292
| style="text-align:right;" | 18.0
| style="text-align:right;" | 23
|-
| style="text-align:left;" |Japanese Communist Party (日本共産党, Nihon Kyōsan-tō)
| style="text-align:right;" | 43
| style="text-align:right;" | 680,200
| style="text-align:right;" | 15.6
| style="text-align:right;" | 13
|-
| style="text-align:left;" |Social Democratic Party (社民党 Shamin-tō)
| style="text-align:right;" | 1
| style="text-align:right;" | 10,165
| style="text-align:right;" | 0.2
| style="text-align:right;" | 0
|-
| style="text-align:left;" |Tokyo Seikatsusha Network (東京・生活者ネットワーク)
| style="text-align:right;" | 10
| style="text-align:right;" | 181,020
| style="text-align:right;" | 4.1
| style="text-align:right;" | 3
|-
| style="text-align:left;" |Gyokaku 110-ban (行革110番)
| style="text-align:right;" | 1
| style="text-align:right;" | 24,259
| style="text-align:right;" | 0.6
| style="text-align:right;" | 1
|-
| style="text-align:left;" | Others
| style="text-align:right;" | 4
| style="text-align:right;" | 27,784
| style="text-align:right;" | 0.6
| style="text-align:right;" | 0
|-
| style="text-align:left;" | Independents
| style="text-align:right;" | 30
| style="text-align:right;" | 248,999
| style="text-align:right;" | 5.7
| style="text-align:right;" | 4
|-
|style="text-align:left;background-color:#E9E9E9"|Total (turnout 43.99%)
|width="30" style="text-align:right;background-color:#E9E9E9"| 220
|width="75" style="text-align:right;background-color:#E9E9E9"| 4,435,435
|width="30" style="text-align:right;background-color:#E9E9E9"| 100.00
|width="30" style="text-align:right;background-color:#E9E9E9"| 127
|-
| style="text-align:left;" colspan=4 |Sources:Tokyo electoral commission: 投開票結果 , JANJAN: 東京都議会議員選挙, Asahi Shimbun: 
|}
NB: Results are incomplete due to lack of sources.

References
City Mayors: Tokyo elections 2005

Tokyo prefectural elections
2005 elections in Japan
July 2005 events in Japan
2005 in Tokyo